Evan Martin Williams is a Canadian actor, best known for his roles on Degrassi: The Next Generation, Awkward and Versailles.

Biography
Williams was born in Swan Hills, Alberta, but raised in Calgary, Alberta. He is a graduate of Henry Wise Wood Senior High School, and studied theatre at Ryerson University (now Toronto Metropolitan University).

Williams first major role was Kelly Ashoona in Degrassi: The Next Generation. His other notable television roles are Baxter McNab in Baxter, Luke in Awkward and Philippe, Chevalier de Lorraine in Versailles, a role that gained him a Canadian Screen Award nomination for Best Performance by an Actor in a Featured Supporting Role in a Dramatic Program or Series.

Williams has worked with the charity buildOn to help build schools in impoverished areas.

Filmography

Film

Television

References

External links
 

21st-century Canadian male actors
Canadian male film actors
Canadian male television actors
Living people
Male actors from Alberta
1984 births